Giulio Guidoni (5 July 1894 – 6 June 1992) was an Italian politician who served as Mayor of Massa (1946–1948), President of the Province of Massa-Carrara (1951–1958), and Senator of the Republic (1958–1963).

References

Bibliography
 
 

1894 births
1992 deaths
Mayors of Massa
People from Massa
Christian Democracy (Italy) politicians
Presidents of the Province of Massa-Carrara
Senators of Legislature III of Italy
20th-century Italian politicians